Juan Carlos Loaiza MacLeod is a Chilean rodeo horse rider. He won the Chilean National Rodeo Championship in 1987, 1988, 1994, 2000, 2001, 2002 and 2007, equalling the record of seven championship wins set by Ramón Cardemil. In 2009 he was named among the best Chilean riders of the 21st century by the Chilean Rodeo Foundation.

National Rodeo Championship

See also 
Huaso
Chilean Horse

References 

1955 births
Chilean male equestrians
Rodeo in Chile
People from Lanco
Living people
20th-century Chilean people
21st-century Chilean people